Siccia dudai is a moth in the family Erebidae. It was described by Povilas Ivinskis and Aidas Saldaitis in 2008. It is found in Oman.

References

Moths described in 2008
Nudariina